Homer M. Kandaras (August 23, 1929 – September 25, 2017) was an American politician in the state of South Dakota. He was a member of the South Dakota State Senate from 1971 to 1976. Throughout his state senate term, he represented the 27th and 28th districts. He is an alumnus of University of South Dakota where he earned his law degree.

References

1929 births
2017 deaths
Democratic Party South Dakota state senators
Politicians from Aberdeen, South Dakota